The Kharkiv tragedy was the burning of an NKVD prison by the retreating Red Army in 1941. 1,200 political prisoners were burned alive, including the actor and director Yukhimenko. The prison was located on Chernyshevsky Street in Kharkiv, Ukraine.

Memorial 
On 17 March 2012, citizens of Kharkiv honored victims of the tragedy for the first time. Participants addressed the toponymic commission of Kharkiv City Council to allow placement of memorials on the Directorate of Police memorial board.

References

 Sources
 Спалені живцем / В.Кисиленко // Газета "Главное". 2012. 10 брезеня.

History of Kharkiv
Ukraine in World War II
Massacres in Ukraine
NKVD
Mass murder in 1941
Soviet World War II crimes
Massacres committed by the Soviet Union
20th century in Kharkiv
Massacres in 1941